Paul Kline (born 1964) is an American photographer known for his editorial, advertising and documentary work.

Biography 
Kline was born in Long Beach, California. He graduated in 1991 from Cornell University with a Bachelor's degree and later he studied at the New York Institute of Photography. He moved to Washington DC. where he met his wife Mercedes. Kline's father Abbott was also a professional photographer, he gave his son his first camera.  Kline has done commercial work for many corporations and ad agencies. His images have appeared in many publications, both new and old media.

Kline also produced photo documentaries such as The Silent Children Project which portrays at-risk children from around the world.

Awards 
 PX3 Competition, Prix de la Photographie, Honorable Mention, Paris 2008
 Olympus & PDN's VisionAge Contest, Honorable Mention, April 2008
 Popular Photography Magazine Photographer of the Year -Finalist, July 2006
 Smithsonian Magazine Photo Contest. April 2005
 American Photo Magazine, Annual Photo Contest, Fall 2002

References

External links 
 Paul Kline's Official Website 
 The Silent Children Project's Website
 The New York Institute of Photography
 Popular Photography's Photographer of the Year 2006

American photographers
Cornell University alumni
Living people
1964 births
People from Long Beach, California
Artists from Washington, D.C.
New York Institute of Photography alumni